Domeyrot is a commune in the Creuse department in the Nouvelle-Aquitaine region in central France.

Geography
The small river Verraux, a tributary of the Petite Creuse, forms the commune's southern and western boundaries.

Population

Sights
 The church, dating from the seventeenth century.
 The Château de Beaupêche.
 Vestiges of the donjon of a fortified manorhouse at the hamlet of Servières.

See also
Communes of the Creuse department

References

Communes of Creuse